In telecommunication, the term protocol-control information or PCI has the following meanings:

  The queries and replies among communications equipment to determine the respective capabilities of each end of the communications link. 
  For layered systems, information exchanged between entities of a given layer, via the service provided by the next lower layer, to coordinate their joint operation.

References

 
Reference models
Telecommunications standards
ISO standards
ITU-T recommendations
ITU-T X Series Recommendations